Go Eun-ah (born Bang Hyo-jin on October 28, 1988) is a South Korean actress. She is best known as Keum-shil in the TV series Golden Apple.

Her brother Mir is a member of the boyband MBLAQ.

Filmography

Film

Television series

Television shows

Awards and nominations

References

External links

South Korean film actresses
South Korean television actresses
Living people
1988 births
People from Jangseong County
Namyang Bang clan